Eois binaria is a moth in the family Geometridae. It is found in Brazil and Colombia.

References

Moths described in 1858
Eois
Moths of South America